A Prince of a King is a 1923 American silent historical adventure film directed by Albert Austin and starring Dean Riesner, Virginia Pearson and Eric Mayne.

Synopsis
In a kingdom in fifteenth century Italy, Duke Roberto overthrows the king and abandons his heir Gigi in the wilderness to die. However he is discovered by a troupe of Gypsy acrobats and emerges as their star performer. Back in the capital he is recognised by the former king's physician leading to the downfall of Roberto.

Cast
 Dean Riesner as Gigi, the Prince
 Virginia Pearson as Queen Claudia
 Eric Mayne as King Lorenzo
 John St. Polis as	Mario 
 Josef Swickard as Urbano 
 Mitchell Lewis as Andrea, the giant
 Sam De Grasse as Duke Roberto

References

Bibliography
 Connelly, Robert B. The Silents: Silent Feature Films, 1910-36, Volume 40, Issue 2. December Press, 1998.
 Munden, Kenneth White. The American Film Institute Catalog of Motion Pictures Produced in the United States, Part 1. University of California Press, 1997.

External links
 

1923 films
1920s historical films
1920s English-language films
American silent feature films
American historical films
American black-and-white films
Selznick Pictures films
Films set in the 5th century
Films directed by Albert Austin
1920s American films